Galaha is a small town located in the central Sri Lanka.

Presently it is administrated by Deltota Divisional secretariat and Patahewaheta Pradeshiya Sabah.

Galaha is a mountain area with green hills and natural water sources. It is a cold and rainy area. A tiny river encircles, and provides sufficient water to the farmers, who cultivate paddy in this region. In Sri Lanka, this is one such place, where step cultivation of paddy is done for the past several centuries. This town is surrounded by mountains, whose top soil is eroded due to the pounding rains and cultivation. And thus, reforestation program by the government, produced beautiful pine forests on them. There were several tea estates, once the profit making industry in this area, are vanished. The nearest tea factory, Galaha Group, one of the largest factories, located at the entrance to the town, abandoned and never restored. Natural minerals like Quarts and Mica are abundant in the surrounding mountains. As such there are no guest houses / lodging available in this towm, however, there is a nice resort near Nillambe, a six km far. This town has a Vihara, a Hindu temple, a Mosque, and a Church.

This town provides everything to its inhabitants. There is a Petrol station and a restaurant, opposite to each other. There also a well maintained government hospital. Economy of this place is depending on the Middle East Employments, agriculture, government jobs and business.

Notable places near the town are Badrawathi Buddhist monk hospital, temple and sacred mountain, meditation center in Nillambe, Rosa thiruwana rock, Belwood Saundarya nikethanaya, the 1st Tea estate of Sri Lanka the Loolkandura Estate, Forest and Sir James Taylor Tea museum, and the Mountain reef.

Post and telephone
 Sri Lanka 00 94
 Area code 081
 Postal code 20420

Maps

References

Populated places in Central Province, Sri Lanka
Populated places in Kandy District